Palta may refer to:
 Palta people, an ethnic group of the Ecuadorian Amazon
 Palta language, a language of the Ecuadorian Amazon
 Palta, North 24 Parganas, a neighbourhood in North Barrackpur municipality, North 24 Parganas district, West Bengal, India
 Paltapara, a census town in Barrackpore I CD Block, North 24 Parganas district, West Bengal, India
 Palta railway station
 Palta, avocado in South American Spanish

See also 
 
 Mari Palta, Swedish scientist

Language and nationality disambiguation pages